Xenophora neozelanica, is a species of medium-sized sea snail, a marine gastropod mollusc in the family Xenophoridae, the carrier snails or carrier shells.

References
 Powell A. W. B., New Zealand Mollusca, William Collins Publishers Ltd, Auckland, New Zealand 1979 

Xenophoridae
Gastropods of New Zealand
Gastropods described in 1908